Raman Singh (born 15 October 1952) is an Indian politician and Former Chief Minister of Chhattisgarh. Currently, he is the National Vice-President of the Bharatiya Janata Party. He is also an ayurvedic practitioner. He is also the longest serving CM of Chhattisgarh for 15 years.

Background
Raman Singh was born in Kawardha to Vighnaharan Singh Thakur, an advocate, and Sudha Singh. After completion of schooling, he graduated from Government Science College, Bemetara in 1972. In year 1975 he also studied Ayurvedic Medicine at Government Ayurvedic College, Raipur.

Political career 
Singh joined the Bharatiya Jan Sangh as a youth member and was the president of youth wing in Kawardha in 1976-77. He progressed to become a councillor of Kawardha municipality in 1983.

He was elected to Madhya Pradesh Legislative Assembly consecutively in 1990 and 1993 from Kawardha (Vidhan Sabha constituency). In 1999 he was elected to the 13th Lok Sabha from the Rajnandgaon constituency in Chhattisgarh. In the government of Atal Bihari Vajpayee, Singh became the Union Minister of State for Commerce and Industry from 1999 to 2003. He was later named as President of the Bharatiya Janata Party (BJP) in the new state of Chhattisgarh, and led the party to a victory in the 2003 state Assembly elections. With the other main contender for the Chief Minister's post, Dilip Singh Judeo, caught in the midst of a scam, the BJP leadership named Raman Singh as Chhattisgarh's second Chief Minister, and the first person to be elected to that post. He entered Vidhan Sabha by contesting bypoll in 2004 from Dongargaon. He has won 3 successive Vidhan Sabha elections - in 2008, 2013, and 2018 - from Rajnandgaon seat.

He has received praise for his organisational abilities, as reflected in his state's position with regard to implementation of a programme to improve the conditions of Scheduled Tribes and Scheduled Castes. The United Nations has also recognised the work done in Chhattisgarh under his leadership and the fiscal management of the state is another aspect for which he is known.

He banned Naxalite organisations in Chhattisgarh in 2002 under the "Salwa Judum" initiative, a move supported by the opposition party as well, led by Mahendra Karma who was assassinated by Naxalites on 25 May 2013. Singh was sworn in for his second term on 12 December 2008. On 8 December 2013 he was re-elected as the chief minister (CM) of the state. In August 2017, Chief Minister Raman Singh completed 5000 days as the Chief Minister of the state. By introducing distribution of major commodities such as wheat, rice, sugar, and kerosene through a network of fair price shops called the public distribution system (PDS), Singh has earned nationwide popularity. As a move to encourage the start up culture and offering several incentives for start up entrepreneur he started the "Startup Chhattisgarh" scheme. His other initiatives include promotion of digital technology, interest free agricultural loans in addition to banning the naxal groups, which made him popular in Chhattisgarh. Singh's government had received attention for number of welfare measures like Medical care, food security, the Charan Paduka Yojana that entitles people to free shoes, the Saraswati Cycle Yojana that promises a free bicycle to school going girls, and Mukhya Mantri Teerth Yatra Yojana that allows the elderly to go on their desired pilgrimage, it had introduced in the course of the 15 odd years it had been in power, despite poverty and agrarian distress for 18 years.

BJP won the election in 2013 for his third tenure as a CM of Chhattisgarh. After the loss of his party in the 2018 assembly elections, he resigned as the CM of Chhattisgarh on 11 December 2018.

Electoral history
 1990 : MLA in Madhya Pradesh Vidhan Sabha, from Kawardha seat
 1993 : MLA in Madhya Pradesh Vidhan Sabha, from Kawardha seat
 1998 : Lost Vidhan Sabha election from Kawardha (Vidhan Sabha constituency)
 1999 : Won Lok Sabha Election, from Rajnandgaon (Lok Sabha constituency)
 2003 : Became Chief Minister of Chhattisgarh, 2003-2018
 2004 : MLA in Chhattisgarh Vidhan Sabha, from Dongargaon seat, via a by-poll
 2008 : MLA in Chhattisgarh Vidhan Sabha, from Rajnandgaon and 2nd term Chief Minister in Chhattisgarh
 2013 : MLA in Chhattisgarh Vidhan Sabha, from Rajnandgaon and 3rd term Chief Minister in Chhattisgarh
 2018 : MLA in Chhattisgarh Vidhan Sabha, from Rajnandgaon.
 2018 : National Vice President of Bhartiya Janta Party.

Notes

References

External links 
 Official website 

|-

|-

1952 births
Living people
Chief ministers from Bharatiya Janata Party
Chief Ministers of Chhattisgarh
Madhya Pradesh MLAs 1990–1992
Madhya Pradesh MLAs 1993–1998
Chhattisgarh MLAs 2000–2003
Chhattisgarh MLAs 2008–2013
Chhattisgarh MLAs 2003–2008
India MPs 1999–2004
Lok Sabha members from Chhattisgarh
People from Kabirdham district
Chhattisgarh MLAs 2013–2018
Rashtriya Swayamsevak Sangh members
Bharatiya Janata Party politicians from Chhattisgarh
People from Rajnandgaon